Xiaohezi Township  is a township in Guyuan County, Zhangjiakou, Hebei, China.

See also
List of township-level divisions of Hebei

References

Township-level divisions of Hebei
Zhangjiakou